St. Louis Browns or St. Louis Brown Stockings may refer to any of four different American baseball teams:
St. Louis Brown Stockings, two separate teams, one existing 1875–1877 and one existing 1878–1881
St. Louis Cardinals, American Association and National League franchise existing 1882–present, called St. Louis Brown Stockings in 1882 and St. Louis Browns 1883–1898
St. Louis Browns, 1902–1953 St. Louis incarnation of an American League franchise existing 1901–present, called Milwaukee Brewers in 1901 and Baltimore Orioles since 1954

See also
St. Louis (NA), exposition on how the two St. Louis National Association teams (one named St. Louis Browns) are denoted and differentiated
Browns (disambiguation)

St. Louis Browns